Morningside Park may refer to:

Morningside Park (Manhattan), New York
Morningside Park (Toronto), Ontario
Morningside Nature Center, Gainesville, Florida